Father Lankester Merrin is a fictional character in the novel The Exorcist (1971), one of the two main protagonists in the 1973 film adaptation, who also figures prominently in several of its prequel and sequel films.

In the novel 
Merrin, an elderly priest and paleontologist on an archeological dig in Iraq, finds images of the demon Pazuzu and subsequently experiences other unusual phenomena. He had previously faced the demon many years before during an exorcism in Africa. The find sparks a premonition that he will battle the demon again in a distant land. Merrin does not appear again until much later in the novel, when he joins the protagonist, Father Damien Karras, in Washington, D.C., to exorcise the demon from the body of a young girl (Regan MacNeil). Merrin, who has a heart disease for which he takes nitroglycerin, dies during the ritual, leaving the inexperienced Karras to complete the exorcism himself.  Merrin is loosely based on the British archaeologist Gerald Lankester Harding.

In the films 

Merrin's depiction in the 1973 film The Exorcist is faithful to the novel. The character of Merrin reappears in the sequel Exorcist II: The Heretic (1977), in extended flashbacks detailing an exorcism he performed in Africa following the Second World War.  He is portrayed in both films by Max von Sydow. The studio wanted Marlon Brando for the role of Father Merrin, but director William Friedkin immediately vetoed this by stating it would become a "Brando movie".

The character was featured again in both prequel films, Exorcist: The Beginning and Dominion: Prequel to the Exorcist. Both films revisit Merrin's experiences in Africa immediately prior to his first exorcism, but each presents a different version of the events and neither agrees with the events as presented in Exorcist II.  He is played in both films by Stellan Skarsgård.

Other adaptations 
In the 2014 BBC Radio dramatisation, Merrin is voiced by Ian McDiarmid.

See also
Exorcism of Roland Doe
Raymond J. Bishop
William S. Bowdern

References

External links
 Max von Sydow as Father Lankester Merrin in the 1973 film The Exorcist at IMDb
 Stellan Skarsgård as Father Lankester Merrin in the 2004 film Exorcist: The Beginning at IMDb

Fictional characters from Washington, D.C.
Fictional Christians
Fictional Dutch people
Fictional exorcists
Fictional priests and priestesses
Characters in American novels of the 20th century
Literary characters introduced in 1971
Male horror film characters
The Exorcist characters